Seo Hyun-deok (born 9 May 1991) is a South Korean male table tennis player. He belongs to Samsung Life Insurance. He won six doubles titles on the ITTF World Tour between 2010 and 2014, including the victory at the 2014 ITTF World Tour Grand Finals. In 2015, he won a bronze medal in men's doubles event with Lee Sang-su at the World Championships.

References

South Korean male table tennis players
Living people
1991 births
World Table Tennis Championships medalists